Tatjana Maria was the defending champion, but lost in the first round to Catherine Bellis.

Naomi Broady won the title, defeating wildcard Robin Anderson in the final, 6–7(6–8), 6–0, 6–2.

Seeds

Main draw

Finals

Top half

Bottom half

External Links
 Main draw

Dow Corning Tennis Classic - Singles
Dow Corning Tennis Classic